In 1944, the Louisiana Office of Veterans Affairs was created to provide local services to Louisiana Veterans and their families. As the number of Veterans in the state grew, so did the need to expand programs and services to support their needs. Thus, in 2003 the Louisiana Department of Veterans Affairs (LDVA) was established as a cabinet-level department of the State of Louisiana with the mission to provide comprehensive care and quality service to Louisiana's Veterans and their families with regard to health care, education, disability benefits, long-term care, and burial honors.

LDVA is responsible for the oversight of the five Louisiana Veterans Homes, the four Louisiana Veterans Cemeteries (with the fifth cemetery currently under construction), and the 64 parish service offices.

LDVA operates many veterans programs, including the Military Family Assistance Fund and the Louisiana Veterans Honor Medal Program.

Veterans Homes

 Louisiana Veterans Home, Jackson, Louisiana
 Northeast Louisiana Veterans Home, Monroe, Louisiana 
 Southwest Louisiana Veterans Home, Jennings, Louisiana
 Northwest Louisiana Veterans Home, Bossier City, Louisiana
 Southeast Louisiana Veterans Home, Reserve, Louisiana

Veterans Cemeteries

 Northwest Louisiana Veterans Cemetery, Keithville, Louisiana
 Central Louisiana Veterans Cemetery, Leesville, Louisiana
 Southeast Louisiana Veterans Cemetery, Slidell, Louisiana opened June 2014
 Northeast Louisiana Veterans Cemetery, Rayville, Louisiana opened November 2015
 Southwest Louisiana Veterans Cemetery, Jennings, Louisiana opening in 2019

Parish Service Offices

For a list of Veterans Parish Service Offices, please visit https://www.vetaffairs.la.gov/locations/

Veterans Programs
 Military Family Assistance Fund
 Louisiana Veterans Honor Medal Program
 State Approving Agency

Directors/Secretaries

 Lindon Dalferes (1924–1944)
 Joe Darwin (1944–1948)
 Joseph F. Colsan (1948–1952)
 Lloyd E. Hatley (1952–1956)
 David J. Bell (1956–1959)
 Emil J. Bourg Jr. (1959–1960)
 Hal A. Burgess (1960–1964)
 L.L. "Dick" Staggs (1964–1973)
 Percy A. Lemoine (1973–1980)
 John L. McGovern (1980–1984)
 Cleo C. Yarbrough (1984–1988)
 Printice A. Darnell (1988–1992)
 Ernie P. Broussard (1992–1996)
 John Caulking (1996–1998)
 Joey Strickland (1998–2004)
 Major-General Hunt Downer (2004–2008) First Secretary
 Lane Carson (2008–2013)
 David LaCerte (2013, interim)
 Rodney Alexander (2013–2014)
 David LaCerte (2014–2016)
 Joey Strickland (2016–present)

References

veterans
State departments of veterans affairs in the United States
Ministries established in 1944
1944 establishments in Louisiana